Ambareesha is a 2014 Indian Kannada-language action film directed and produced by Mahesh Sukhadhare under the Sri Sukhadhare Pictures banner. The film stars Darshan, Rachita Ram and Priyamani.  Dr.Ambareesh and his wife Sumalatha Ambareesh will be seen in guest roles. The soundtrack and score is composed by V. Harikrishna and the cinematography is by Ramesh Babu.

Plot 
After a social activist is murdered, a labourer decides to continue his fight against the real estate mafia in Bengaluru. He faces an uphill battle as they do everything in their power to subdue him.

Cast

 Darshan as Ambareesha, Protagonist
 Rachita Ram as Karuna, Ambareesha's girlfriend  
 Priyamani as Smitha
 Kelly Dorji as  RDX
 Dr.Ambareesh as Naadaprabhu Kempegowda 
 Sampath Raj
 Sumalatha
 Umashree
 Ravi Kale
 Saurav Lokesh 
 Sharath Lohitashwa 
 Sadhu Kokila
 Bullet Prakash

Production
The principal shooting for the film formally began on 7 October 2013.

Soundtrack

Release

Distribution 

References

External links
 

2014 films
Indian action films
Films scored by V. Harikrishna
2010s Kannada-language films
2014 action films